Nahikari García Pérez (born 10 March 1997) is a Spanish professional footballer who plays as a forward for Liga F club Real Madrid CF and the Spain women's national team.

García begun her professional career with Añorga KKE before joining Real Sociedad in 2014. She went on to make over 200 appearances and holds the club's record for the most goals scored in a single season with her return of 16 goals in 2016. During her time with Real, she was nominated for the Primera División forward of the Season award and helped the club win its first ever Copa de la Reina in 2019. She joined Real Madrid on 1st July 2021 after eight years at Real Sociedad.

García also represented Spain at various youth levels, reaching three major tournament finals, and captained the U19 team before making her senior debut in 2018.

Club career

Early career
García started playing football at the age of nine in San Sebastián when she joined a sports programme with her local side in Urnieta. The programme wasn't solely football based, however, which prompted to her to leave to sign for Añorga KKE where she spent seven years.

Real Sociedad
In the 2014–15 winter transfer market Real Sociedad completed the signing of García, who was only sixteen at the time, from Añorga. On 5 January, just days after signing for the club, she was handed her Primera División debut by manager Unai Gazpio against Levante. She ended the campaign with 10 goals to her name for the season.

In the following season García recorded a record-breaking tally of 16 goals for the season, the most ever in a single season by a Real Sociedad player. Her seasonal haul included a notable goal against rivals Athletic Bilbao and a hat-trick against Levante during December which propelled the Txuri-urdin to a fifth-place finish in the Primera División, the club's highest placing since formation in 2004. Real Sociedad also made the quarter-finals of the Copa de la Reina where they were eliminated 5–1 by eventual runners-up Barcelona, with García netting the only goal of the match for her club. García's form throughout the season saw her nominated for the Primera División forward of the Season award.

Early in September 2016, García appeared alongside Charlyn Corral, Alexia Putellas, Iraia Iturregi and Amanda Sampedro in a video promoting the buildup to the  2016–17 season. She scored her first hat-trick for the season on 9 December in a 4–0 league victory over Oiartzun and in April the following year signed a new two-year deal with the club. A goal from García on the final match-day of the campaign was not enough to prevent Athletic from being crowned champions, as Real Sociedad went down 2–1 to their local Basque rivals.

Real Sociedad struggled during the first half of the following season and in November the club sacked manager Juanjo Arregi. García was quick to dismiss criticism of her former coach in an interview with Mundo Deportivo, stating that she was saddened by his departure and that the players should shoulder some of the blame. The following month, she scored five goals in a 6–1 win over Zaragoza and in the process helped the club move clear of the relegation zone. She ultimately scored 17 goals for the season as the team improved to end the campaign in seventh. Following the conclusion of the season, she was afforded the opportunity to sign for French side Paris Saint-Germain but elected to remain with Real Sociedad and continue her medical studies in Spain.

On 17 February 2019, García assisted teammate Kiana Palacios in Real Sociedad's 3–1 win over Sevilla and in doing so helped the club qualify for the final of the Copa de la Reina for the first time in its history. The final took place on 11 May where García scored the winning goal in a 2–1 victory over Atlético Madrid to guide the club to its first-ever Cup win.

Real Madrid
On 1 July 2021, García signed for Real Madrid.

International career
García has worn the number 7 jersey for both club and country during the course of her career. She credits former Real Madrid and Spain men's captain Raúl for her decision to wear the number, citing his style of play and on-field mentality as motivation in her own game.

Spain national youth teams
García's first exposure to the Spanish youth teams came when she was just fifteen-years old when she was called up to replace a player who was unable to travel with the U17 team.

In 2013 García, while representing Spain's U17 side, was awarded the Golden Boot award at the 2013 UEFA Women's Under-17 Championship, ending the tournament as the top goalscorer and only player to have scored more than once. Spain were ultimately eliminated by Sweden in the semi-finals but ended the tournament in third after beating Belgium in the third place playoff. She was again part of the squad for the 2014 edition of the tournament where Spain went one step further, this time ending as runners-up to Germany. It was the second time in the same year that Spain had ended a major competition as runners-up, having lost to Japan in the final of the FIFA U-17 Women's World Cup in April.

In July 2016 García, who was Real Sociedad's only representative in the squad, captained Spain to a silver medal at the UEFA Women's Under-19 Championship, losing 2–1 in the final to hosts France. She had two opportunities to draw Spain level but found herself the victim of a waterlogged pitch, missing a penalty in the opening half before 'skying' a near-open goal opportunity in injury-time as a result of the on-field conditions. The match was suspended for over two hours after half-time due to the weather conditions and upon the players' return to the pitch certain sections of the field were entirely waterlogged. García was ridiculed by large sections of the media for the miss but received overwhelming support from her fan-base, prompting her to take to Instagram following the tournament to thank those who stood behind her and the team. The showpiece match was her third appearance in a continental final, having previously ended as runner-up in the tournament's previous edition and as well as in the UEFA Women's Under-17 Championship in 2014. The record is one which she shares with teammates Andrea Sánchez Falcón and Naria Garrote.

Later that year, García was selected as one of the captains for the 2016 FIFA U-20 Women's World Cup to be held in Papua New Guinea. She made her debut on 13 November in Spain's opening match of the tournament, a 5–0 victory over Canada. García scored her first and only goal for the tournament on 24 November in a 3–2 loss to South Korea that saw Spain eliminated in the quarter-finals.

Spain senior national team
In August 2018, García was called up to the senior Spain squad for the first time by manager Jorge Vilda. She made her debut on 31 August and scored within eight minutes of coming on as a second-half substitute in a 5–1 win over Finland.

In 2019, García was called up for the 2019 World Cup.

Sponsorships
García is currently sponsored by Spanish sportswear manufacturer Joma.

Personal life

García's first name, Nahikari, derives from her Basque origin and represents the values of nobility, loyalty and intelligence. Aside from football, she is also currently studying towards a degree in medicine and completed her first course in 2016. In an interview with AS in the same year she explained that while it was "a little crazy" to combine her degree with football, she felt that football helped her with her studies and vice versa.

Superstition
García is fastidious when it comes to pre-match rituals. She plays with the same tape, wears two pairs of socks and always enters the field of play with her right foot first.

Career statistics

Club

International

International goals

Honours

Club
Real Sociedad
 Copa de la Reina: 2018–19

International
Spain 
Runner-up: UEFA Women's Under-17 Championship (2): 2013; 2014
Runner-up: FIFA U-17 Women's World Cup: 2014
Runner-up: UEFA Women's Under-19 Championship (2): 2015; 2016

Individual
UEFA Women's Under-17 Championship: Golden Boot 2013

References

External links

 
 
 Nahikari Garcia at Liga de Fútbol Profesional

1997 births
Living people
Spanish women's footballers
Primera División (women) players
People from Donostialdea
Footballers from the Basque Country (autonomous community)
Women's association football forwards
Real Sociedad (women) players
Real Madrid Femenino players
Añorga KKE players
Spain women's international footballers
Sportspeople from Gipuzkoa
2019 FIFA Women's World Cup players
Spain women's youth international footballers
21st-century Spanish women